Rescuing Sprite: A Dog Lover's Story of Joy and Anguish is a non-fiction work written in 2007 by Mark Levin, that tells his experience of rescuing a dog named Sprite from a local animal shelter that would change him and his family's lives forever.

Plot Summary
After much convincing, Mark Levin and his family adopted a Spaniel mix named Sprite and immediately the whole family developed a deep bond with him. Even the Levin's current dog from years prior, Pepsi, develops a deep relationship with the newly rescued Sprite right off the bat. Three weeks after rescuing Sprite, the Levin family started to notice Sprite's health was deteriorating and Sprite eventually collapses on Halloween, landing him and the Levin family a visit to the animal hospital. Little did the Levin family know, this would be the first of many visits to the animal hospital as Sprite's condition continually worsened. Further, they discover him to be older than they had originally thought. It shows the pain, passion, and love the Levin family and Sprite experience with their short amount of time together.

Main Characters
Mark Levin- Author, Father, Husband
Kendall Levin- Wife and Mother
Lauren Levin- Daughter
Chase Levin- Son
Pepsi- Dog
Sprite- Rescued Dog

Critical reception
Based on the reviews on Barnes and Nobles, customers rated the book a 4.2/5. According to Amazon, "Rescuing Sprite is a stunningly intimate revelation of the strong love that can develop between a family and a pet" and was rated a 4.4/5. It was also rated a 3.9 out of 5.

References

2007 children's books
American non-fiction books
American children's books
Children's non-fiction books
Dogs in literature